Patrice Maktav, born 1 March 1978 in Annecy, is a French singer and actor.

Biography
Although he originally aspired to be an actor, Maktav first rose to fame in 2001 as a member of the first season of Star Academy, a French singing competition show, in which he was a semi-finalist. On the show he met and began dating Olivia Ruiz, another semi-finalist, and after participating in the Star Academy Tour he went on to write for her albums La Femme chocolat and "J'aime pas l'amour". In 2002 he released a single called "Anonyme" which found success due to his recent Star Academy fame. He then founded a rock group, Aktarüs. In 2007 he wrote an album that was released digitally in 2009 under the name "MAKTAV".  He wrote and acted in humorous sketches that were put online and found work in small theatrical productions until late 2009 when he was cast in Mozart, l'opéra rock in the role of Lorenzo da Ponte.  The show had two successful runs in Paris at the Palais des Sports and two successful international tours before its ultimate representations on 7–9 July 2011 in Paris at the Palais Omnisports de Paris-Bercy. In mid-2012 he began appearing on the long-running daily French soap opera Plus belle la vie.

Discography

Albums 
2009: Patrice Maktav

Filmography 
2002: A+ Pollux – a guest at the party
2003: Sortie des artistes – Raphael Di Parlo
2004: Le monde de Chico, television series
2004: Mathilde au matin – l'agresseur
2006: L'ellipse  – l'illuminé
2008: L'amour dans le sang – David Chapel
2009: La peau de l'ours – Sergent Frédéric
2012: Plus belle la vie – Michaël Malkavian

External links 

1978 births
Living people
People from Annecy
French male film actors
Cours Florent alumni
21st-century French singers
21st-century French male singers